.vu is the Internet country code top-level domain (ccTLD) for Vanuatu. Initially delegated to Telecom Vanuatu Ltd, it was redelegated to the Telecommunications Radiocommunications and Broadcasting Regulator in 2019.

While .vu domains were initially given away for free to any person requesting one, they are now being sold commercially as is common practice for other top-level domains.

External links
 IANA .vu whois information

Country code top-level domains
Communications in Vanuatu
Internet properties established in 1995

sv:Toppdomän#V